The Basketball Federation of Serbia is a non-profit organization and the national sports governing body for basketball in Serbia.

The organization represents Serbia in FIBA and the men's and women's national basketball teams in the Olympic Committee of Serbia. The Federation traditionally selects the Serbian Basketball Player of the Year.

History

Structure

Managing board
According to the Federation Statute, the Managing Board is constituted by the representatives elected through a semi-mandatory system. This means that a half of the executive body members is appointed by the President and the remaining four will be elected by The Federation Assembly. The Managing Board members are elected on four-year mandate.

Presidents

Secretary General

Logos

National teams' medals

Basketball

3x3

Club Competitions

Major

Current champions
Note: These lists are correct through the end of the 2019–20 season.

Minor 
 Second Men's League of Serbia (2nd-tier)
 First Regional Men's League (3rd-tier)
 Second Regional Men's League (4th-tier)
 Men's League Cup (2nd-tier)

Hall of Fame inductees
 Naismith Memorial Basketball Hall of Fame
 Borislav Stanković (1991, contributor)
 Aleksandar Nikolić (1998, coach)
 Dražen Dalipagić (2004, player)
 Vlade Divac (2019, player)
 Radivoj Korać (2022, player)
 FIBA Hall of Fame
 Nebojša Popović (contributor)
 Borislav Stanković (contributor)
 Radomir Šaper (contributor)
 Aleksandar Nikolić (2007, coach)
 Ranko Žeravica (2007, coach)
 Obrad Belošević (2007, technical official)
 Radivoj Korać (2007, player)
 Dražen Dalipagić (2007, player)
 Dragan Kićanović (2010, player)
 Vlade Divac (2010, player)
 Zoran Slavnić (2013, player)
 Dušan Ivković (2017, coach)
 Svetislav Pešić (2020, coach)
 Milan Vasojević (2022, coach)
 Women's Basketball Hall of Fame
 Borislav Stanković (2000, contributor)
 Jasmina Perazić (2014, player)

See also
 List of Serbian NBA players

References

External links
Website 
 Profile at fiba.basketball
Serbia participation – FIBA archive
Serbia at fibaeurope.com
Regional Associations
Basketball Association of Vojvodina 
Basketball Association of Belgrade
Regional Basketball Association of Southern Serbia
Regional Basketball Association of Central Serbia
Regional Basketball Association of Western Serbia
Regional Basketball Association of Eastern Serbia
Regional Basketball Association of Raška–Kosovo

Basketball in Serbia
Basketball
Serbia
Sports organizations established in 1948